Andrew Wilson was a Scottish professional footballer who played as a left back for Sunderland and Partick Thistle.

He spent seven full seasons at Partick after joining the club in 1897, winning the 1899–1900 Scottish Division Two title (the team was relegated, but gained promotion again in 1902) and forming a defensive partnership with Robert Campbell for much of that time. Although he had reached the end of his time with the club and had already been out on loan to Alloa Athletic (who would soon sign him on a permanent basis), at the end of his eighth campaign on the books at Thistle in May 1905 he was granted a benefit match against Celtic.

References

Scottish footballers
Association football defenders
Strathclyde F.C. players
Sunderland A.F.C. players
Partick Thistle F.C. players
Alloa Athletic F.C. players
English Football League players
Scottish Football League players
Scottish Junior Football Association players